Fermented fish is a traditional preservation of fish. Before refrigeration, canning and other modern preservation techniques became available, fermenting was an important preservation method. Fish rapidly spoils, or goes rotten, unless some method is applied to stop the bacteria that produce the spoilage. Fermentation is a method which attacks the ability of microbials to spoil fish. It does this by making the fish muscle more acidic; bacteria usually cease multiplying when the pH drops below 4.5.

A modern approach, biopreservation, adds lactic acid bacteria to the fish to be fermented. This produces active antimicrobials such as lactic and acetic acid, hydrogen peroxide, and peptide bacteriocins. It can also produce the antimicrobial nisin, a particularly effective preservative.

Fermented fish preparations can be notable for their putrid smell. These days there are many other techniques of preserving fish, but fish is still fermented because some people enjoy the taste.


Risks

Alaska has witnessed a steady increase of cases of botulism since 1985. It has more cases of foodborne botulism than any other state in the United States of America. This is caused by the traditional Eskimo practice of allowing animal products such as whole fish, fish heads, walrus, sea lion, and whale flippers, beaver tails, seal oil, birds, etc., to ferment for an extended period of time before being consumed. The risk is exacerbated when a plastic container is used for this purpose instead of the old-fashioned, traditional method, a grass-lined hole, as the botulinum bacteria thrive in the anaerobic conditions created by the air-tight enclosure in plastic.

Preparations

See also
 Food fermentation
 Preserved fish

Notes

References
 Kose S and GM (2011) "Sustainability of fermented fish products" Pages 39–47. In: George Hall, Fish Processing: Sustainability and New Opportunities, John Wiley & Sons. .
 Steinkraus, Keith H (2004) Industrialization of Indigenous Fermented Foods CRC Press. .

 
Inuit cuisine
Seafood in Native American cuisine
Umami enhancers